Göynücek District is a district of Amasya Province of Turkey. Its seat is the town Göynücek. Its area is 591 km2, and its population is 10,291 (2021). It borders the provinces of Tokat, Çorum and Yozgat.

Composition
There is one municipality in Göynücek District:
 Göynücek

There are 38 villages in Göynücek District:

 Abacı
 Alan
 Ardıçpınar
 Asar
 Ayvalıpınar
 Başpınar
 Bekdemir
 Beşiktepe
 Çamurlu
 Çayan
 Çaykışla
 Çulpara
 Damlaçimen
 Davutevi
 Gaffarlı
 Gediksaray
 Gökçeli
 Harmancık
 Hasanbey
 İkizyaka
 Ilısu
 Karaşar
 Karayakup
 Kertme
 Kervansaray
 Kışlabeyi
 Konuralan
 Koyuncu
 Kuyulu Kavaklı
 Pembeli
 Şarklı
 Şeyhler
 Şeyhoğlu
 Sığırçayı
 Tencerli
 Terziköy
 Yassıkışla
 Yeniköy

Places of interest
 The Roman castle of Gökçeli on a rock overlooking the valley, 8 km from the town Göynücek. It is reached by a hidden path of 98 steps. 
 The mineral waters of the village of Çamurlu, said to relieve kidney stones.

References

Districts of Amasya Province